Admiral John Ewen Cameron CB MVO (15 June 1874 – 28 July 1939) was a Royal Navy officer who became Commander-in-Chief, Coast of Scotland.

Naval career
Born in London, Cameron was commissioned into the Royal Navy in 1887 and went on to fight in the Second Boer War. He served in World War I and took part in the Battle of Jutland as Captain of the cruiser HMS Phaeton. After the War he commanded the battlecruiser HMS Tiger and then the aircraft carrier HMS Glorious.

He was appointed Commander-in-Chief, Coast of Scotland in 1928. He was promoted to vice-admiral on 23 May 1929 and retired the following day. He was promoted to Admiral on the Retired List on 1 September 1933.

He lived at Christon Bank near Embleton in Northumberland.

Family
In 1906 he married Marion Gertrude Granger; they had four daughters.

References

1874 births
1939 deaths
Companions of the Order of the Bath
Members of the Royal Victorian Order
Royal Navy admirals
People from Embleton, Northumberland
Military personnel from Northumberland
Royal Navy personnel of the Second Boer War
Royal Navy personnel of World War I